The 1952 Critérium du Dauphiné Libéré was the 6th edition of the cycle race and was held from 1 June to 8 June 1952. The race started and finished in Grenoble. The race was won by Jean Dotto of the France Sport team.

General classification

References

1952
1952 in French sport
June 1952 sports events in Europe